The Fiber-Optic Improved Next-Generation Doppler Search for Exo-Earths (FINDS Exo-Earths) is a radial-velocity spectrograph developed by Debra Fischer. It is installed on the 3 meter telescope in Lick Observatory in Mount Hamilton. It has been in operation since 2009 and is being used to verify exoplanet candidates found by Kepler.

At Yale University, Debra Fischer and Julien Spronck, along with Geoff Marcy of the University of California, Berkeley, set out to improve existing spectrograph technologies. Spurred by a $45,000 grant from The Planetary Society, the team built FINDS, a spectrograph add-on device.

See also

 Anglo-Australian Planet Search or AAPS is another southern hemisphere planet search program.
 CORALIE spectrograph is a similar instrument.
 ELODIE spectrograph is the precursor instrument.
 ESPRESSO is a new-generation spectrograph for ESO's VLT.
 HARPS is a similar instrument in La Silla.
 List of extrasolar planets
 SOPHIE échelle spectrograph is a similar instrument.

References

Astronomical instruments
Telescope instruments
Exoplanet search projects
Spectrographs
The Planetary Society